Lady Li or Lishi (李氏, died 263) was a Chinese noble lady and aristocrat from the Three Kingdoms period. She was born of the Li family and lived most of her life in the city of Jiangyou (江油) in the domain of Shu Han state. Lady Li is best known for her role in the Conquest of Shu by Wei (263-264), she faced Ma Miao (馬邈), the governor of her city, who surrendered Jiangyou to Cao Wei state. 

The defenders of the Shu state were so shocked that Lady Li persuaded her husband to fight Wei to the death, biting her finger to write a blood letter, and then hanged herself with the blood book. She ended up committing suicide to demonstrate loyalty to the Shu kingdom; she was later praised by Deng Ai, a general of Cao Wei.

Lady Li was used as a symbol of resistance by Cheng Yanqiu, one of the greatest performers of Peking Opera and a member of the Chinese Communist Party, during the Japanese invasion of China. Yanqiu created the play called ''The Martyrdom of Lady Li'', where he highlights Lady Li's loyalty to her nation and Ma Miao's cowardice as an affront to the reactionary Kuomintang government that surrendered to the Japanese Empire. This play roused the patriotic enthusiasm of most Chinese people, leading to its censorship by the Chinese government shortly thereafter.

In Romance of the Three Kingdoms 
Her early life was not recorded in historical records. She married Ma Miao, governor of Jiangyou, a city located in Sichuan province. The most notable mentions about her were in the 14th century historical novel, Romance of the Three Kingdoms, which romanticizes previous events and during the Three Kingdoms period of China.

The novel introduces Lady Li in Chapter 117. Lady Li's husband, Ma Miao, was the governor of Jiangyou. During Conquest of Shu by Wei, he heard that the land of the east river had fallen into the enemy's hands. Although there was something prepared for the defense, his post had a large area to protect, and he was confident that Jiang Wei would defend the Saber Pass. Therefore, he did not take his military duties very seriously, just staying at home. In 263, when Deng Ai of Wei marched to Jiangyou, Ma Miao was treacherous and refused to lead the defense saying that it was up to Jiang Wei.  

When Lady Li heard about the state of affairs at the border, she said to the governor,  "If there is so great danger on the borders, how is it you are so unaffected?". Ma Miao replied, "The affair is in Jiang Wei's hands and is not my concern". She then replied, "Nevertheless, you finally have to guard the capital, and that is a heavy responsibility."  

Referring to the cowardice of the Emperor of Shu, Liu Shan, Ma Miao replied Lady Li saying: "O, well! The Emperor trusts his favorite Huang Hao entirely and is sunk in vice and pleasure. Disaster is very near. If the Wei armies get here, I shall yield. It is no good taking it seriously. "  

Filled with concern regarding the state of Shu, Lady Li tried by herself to raise the morale of the troops to defend the city. She insulted Ma Miao's treachery and reprimanded him for his complacency in protecting Jiangyou, saying: "You call yourself a man! Have you such a disloyal and treacherous heart? Is it nothing to have held office and taken pay for years? How can I bear to look upon your face?". Ma Miao was rendered speechless by her harsh scolding. Just then Lady Li's house servants came to tell her that Deng Ai, with his two thousand troops, had found their way along some road and had already broken into the city. Ma Miao was now frightened and hastily went out to find the leader and offer his formal submission. He went to the Town Hall and bowed on the steps, crying, "I have long desired to come over to Wei. Now I yield myself and my army and all the town."

Deng Ai accepted Ma Miao's surrender and incorporated his army with his own force. He took Ma Miao into his service as guide to fight against Shu Han. Then came a servant with the news: "Lady Li has hanged herself!" 

In response to Deng Ai and his troops forcing Ma Miao to surrender, Lady Li hanged herself to demonstrate loyalty to the Shu Han. Upon learning her reasons for doing so, Deng Ai commended Lady Li's fealty and personally arranged her funeral. Lady Li's unexpected resistance and, consequently, suicide, impacted both armies; Deng Ai stopped the advance and dedicated himself to honoring her as a last heroine of the state Shu Han before conquering the capital Chengdu. A poem was made to praise her honorable conduct:

 When the Ruler of Shu had wandered from the way,
 And the House of Han fell lower,
 Heaven sent Deng Ai to smite the land.
 Then did a woman show herself most noble,
 So noble in conduct,
 That no leader equaled her.

After the fall of Jiangyou, the capital of Shu Han Chengdu was taken over by the forces of Cao Wei, so Shu's emperor, Liu Shan, surrendered, thus ending the state of Shu Han.

Legacy

The Martyrdom of Lady Li (Dead Sichuan, 亡蜀鉴) 
A Chinese opera "Jianyou Pass" highlights Lady Li's role. This Peking Opera repertoire was adapted by Cheng Yanqiu  from Romance of the Three Kingdoms and was called "The Martyrdom of Lady Li". The play's script follows the same plot of the romance, with additional details that made the opera more elaborate and dramatic. In the opera Lady Li had one daughter, in which she expresses concern about her daughter's future. 

This play was created to promote the spirit of patriotism, criticize surrender and praise Lady Li's fair martyrdom and loyalty, in order to inspire military and civilians to fight against the Japanese Empire during the Japanese invasion of China.

Censorship 
In 1933, Japanese imperialists were gradually invading northern China. The reactionary Kuomintang government adopted non-resistance and prepared to surrender. Cheng Yanqiu used the story in "Romance of the Three Kingdoms" to write this play to show the public their outrage at China's surrender to the Japanese Empire. He used as a metaphor the case of Lady Li, a woman who scolded her city governor for surrendering to the enemy, who in anger and humiliation at losing her country ended up committing suicide. This play became known as an act of resistance to the Chinese government's decision to surrender, which eventually led to the banning of this play after it had been performed twice.

References

Sources 
 Chen, Shou (3rd century). Records of the Three Kingdoms (Sanguozhi).
 Luo, Guanzhong (14th century). Romance of the Three Kingdoms (Sanguo Yanyi).

People of Shu Han
263 deaths
Year of birth unknown
3rd-century Chinese women
3rd-century Chinese people
Suicides in Shu Han